Rugby in the United Kingdom could refer to the following:

 Rugby, England
 Rugby School

Rugby football
Note that for rugby purposes Ireland plays as a single unit, but the constituent nations of the UK are organised separately:

 Rugby league in the United Kingdom
 Rugby league in England
 Rugby league in Ireland
 Rugby league in Scotland
 Rugby league in Wales
 Rugby union in the United Kingdom
 Rugby union in England
 Rugby union in Ireland
 Rugby union in Scotland
 Rugby union in Wales